Gisele Caroline Bündchen (born 20 July 1980) is a Brazilian fashion model. Since 2001, she has been one of the highest-paid models in the world. In 2007, Bündchen was the 16th-richest woman in the entertainment industry and earned the top spot on Forbes top-earning models list in 2012. In 2014, she was listed as the 89th-most-powerful woman in the World by Forbes.

Vogue credited Bündchen with ending the heroin chic era of modelling in 1999. Bündchen was a Victoria's Secret Angel from 1999 until 2006. She is credited with pioneering and popularizing the horse walk, a stomping movement created by a model lifting her knees high and kicking her feet to step. In 2007, Claudia Schiffer called Bündchen the only remaining supermodel. Bündchen has appeared on more than 1,200 magazine covers.

Bündchen was nominated for Choice Movie Female Breakout Star and for Choice Movie Villain at the 2005 Teen Choice Awards for her supporting role in Taxi (2004). She had a supporting role in The Devil Wears Prada (2006) and was the executive producer of an educational environmental cartoon, Gisele & the Green Team, in 2010 to 2011. In 2016, she appeared in the Emmy Award-winning documentary series Years of Living Dangerously, in the episode "Fueling the Fire". Bündchen's charitable endeavors include Save the Children, Red Cross and Doctors Without Borders. She has been a Goodwill Ambassador for the United Nations Environment Program since 2009.

Family and early life
Born in Horizontina, Rio Grande do Sul, Bündchen is a sixth-generation German Brazilian, born to Vânia (née Nonnenmacher), a bank clerk pensioner, and Valdir Bündchen, a sociologist and writer. Her grandfather, Walter Bündchen, once served as mayor of Horizontina. She grew up with five sisters, Raquel, Graziela, Gabriela, Rafaela and her fraternal twin, Patrícia. The family was Catholic. Although her parents speak German and Bündchen learned German in school, she no longer speaks the language. Bündchen speaks Portuguese, English, Italian, Spanish, and some French.

Bündchen aspired to be a volleyball player, but in 1993 her mother enrolled her and sisters Patrícia and Gabriela in a modelling course to teach them confidence and better posture. After the course ended, the girls were rewarded by a trip to Curitiba, São Paulo and Rio de Janeiro, where she was discovered by Elite Model Management at a shopping mall. Bündchen was placed second in a national contest, Elite Model Look, that was then known as Look of the Year. In 1995, Bündchen moved to São Paulo to launch her modelling career. She debuted at New York Fashion Week in 1996.

Career

1997–2000: Career beginnings
In 1997, Bündchen was rejected 42 times in London before being cast in an Alexander McQueen runway show in 1998. In 1998, Bündchen posed for Missoni, Chloé, Dolce & Gabbana, Valentino, Gianfranco Ferré, Ralph Lauren, and Versace campaigns. She appeared on the cover of Vogue Paris, her first cover of British Vogue, and i-D, which featured her on its cover, profiling "A Girl Called Gisele". Dissatisfied with Elite Model Management's work environment, Bündchen signed with IMG Models in 1999.

Bündchen's first U.S Vogue cover, where Vogue announced Bündchen was "the return of the sexy model", was the first of three Vogue covers for her in 1999. In November she appeared in a group Vogue cover with Kate Moss, Amber Valletta, Christy Turlington, Iman, Lauren Hutton, Naomi Campbell, Stephanie Seymour, Claudia Schiffer, Lisa Taylor, Paulina Porizkova, Carolyn Murphy, and Patti Hansen, and appeared in a solo U.S. Vogue cover in December. Bündchen won the VH1/Vogue Model of the Year in 1999. After Bündchen appeared in five major campaigns at age 18, New York magazine editor Sally Singer deemed her an "über" model. She became the fourth model to appear on the cover of Rolling Stone magazine when she was named "The Most Beautiful Girl in the World" in 2000. In 2000, Vogues online encyclopedia of models called Bündchen the world's hottest model and called Bündchen "the Brazilian bombshell".

2000–2009: Modelling breakthrough, international success, and acting debut

In 2000, Bündchen appeared on 37 international Vogue covers, including three in the American edition. In January 2000, Bündchen was featured on the covers of the U.S. and British editions of Vogue. For spring 2000 fashion week, she opened shows for Marc Jacobs, Michael Kors, Dolce & Gabbana, Christian Dior, and Valentino in New York, Milan and Paris. From 1998 to 2003, Bündchen was in 11 consecutive Dolce & Gabbana fashion campaigns. From 2006 to 2009 she became the face of Dolce & Gabbana's fragrance "The One". Bündchen retired from the runway after signing a five-year contract with Victoria's Secret.

In 2000, Bündchen wore Victoria's Secret's Red Hot Fantasy Bra worth $15 million and listed in Guinness World Records as the most expensive lingerie ever created. Bündchen modelled the Sexy Splendor Fantasy Bra in 2005, the second-most expensive bra valued at $12.5 million.

In 2004, she appeared on a group U.S. Vogue cover, with Daria Werbowy, Natalia Vodianova, Isabeli Fontana, Karolina Kurkova, Liya Kebede, Hana Soukupova, Gemma Ward, and Karen Elson. Bündchen appeared on the covers of W, Allure, GQ, Forbes, Marie Claire, Time, Vanity Fair, Esquire, and in the Pirelli Calendar. Bündchen co-starred with Queen Latifah and Jimmy Fallon in the 2004 remake of Taxi, and Bündchen played Serena in The Devil Wears Prada in 2006. In 2007, Mario Testino photographed Bündchen for the cover of Vanity Fairs style issue. In 2008, she appeared on the controversial cover of Vogue with NBA player LeBron James. The cover was criticized for perpetuating racial stereotypes after James bared his teeth in a perceived gorilla-type pose.

Forbes listed Bündchen as No. 53 on their 2007 list of the most powerful celebrities. In 2010, Bündchen's flip-flop line for Ipanema sold more than 250 million pairs for an estimated $197 million. In May 2007, Bündchen ended her contract with Victoria's Secret. In her memoir, Lessons: My Path to a Meaningful Life, Bündchen said she left Victoria's Secret because she was uncomfortable being photographed in lingerie. In August 2008, the New York Daily News named Bündchen as the one of the most powerful people in the fashion world.

2009–2011: Continued success
The Independent referred to Bündchen the biggest star in fashion history in May 2009. In April 2010, Bündchen appeared on the cover of American Vogue for the 11th time. Bündchen closed Balenciaga's 2010 show in a surprise appearance. In 2011, CEOWorld Magazine ranked Bündchen among their Top Accomplished Women Entertainers. She was ranked No. 95 in FHM magazine's 100 Sexiest Women in the World 2011. In 2007, Bündchen was named by Forbes as the World's Richest Supermodel. On 11 April 2008, a black-and-white photo of Bündchen shot by Irving Penn was auctioned for $193,000.

By 2010, Bündchen had appeared on two Vogue Shape issue covers, more than any other celebrity or model. She ranked No. 45 in the 2011 FHM Australia list of 100 Sexiest Women in the World. In 2011, Men's Health named Bündchen as No. 25 of the 100 Hottest Women of All Time. Bündchen closed the 2011 Givenchy spring-summer fashion show in a surprise appearance during Paris Fashion Week. That year, Bündchen launched eco-friendly Sejaa Pure Skincare, a skin care product line using all-natural ingredients.

She appeared on eight Vogue covers in 2011, more than any other model or celebrity that year. Her July Vogue Brasil 2011 cover that was shot in the Amazon sold 70,743 copies, making it the magazine's highest-selling issue. In early 2011, Procter & Gamble's Pantene shampoo sales increased 40 percent in Latin America after Bündchen started representing the product.

2012–present: Modelling campaigns and music endeavors
In spring 2012, Bündchen was featured in three spring campaigns, Versace, Givenchy, and Salvatore Ferragamo. She became the face of Banco do Brasil's first global ad campaign in 2012.
In April 2012, Time listed Bündchen on its All-Time 100 Fashion Icons list, which highlighted the most influential fashion icons since 1923. Vogue included Bündchen in its spotlight of the 10 women who had most appeared on its covers to honor the magazine's 120th anniversary in August 2012.

Bündchen made 5,600 appearances in commercials in Brazil in 2012. She replaced Kate Moss as the face of David Yurman in August 2012. She was photographed by Peter Lindbergh for the fall 2012 campaign. By 2012, Bündchen had appeared on 120 Vogue covers. She holds the record for appearing on the most Vogue Brasil covers.

In February 2013, Bündchen became the face of Chanel's make-up line, Les Beiges. The campaign was photographed by Mario Testino. For Louis Vuitton's spring/summer 2014 campaign, Marc Jacobs chose Bündchen, Catherine Deneuve, Sofia Coppola, Fan Bingbing, Caroline de Maigret and Edie Campbell as his muses. In December 2013, Bündchen became Pantene's ambassador, a deal worth $4 million per year.

Bündchen released a cover of the Kinks "All Day and All of the Night" as a contribution to H&M's 2013 charity campaign. She contributed to H&M's 2014 charity campaign by teaming with French music producer and DJ Bob Sinclar to record a cover of Blondie's 1979 classic "Heart of Glass", on which she was credited as Gisele. The single charted in France, Germany, Spain, Austria and Belgium.

In May 2014, Bündchen was chosen as the spokeswoman for Chanel No. 5. Within the first quarter of 2014, Bündchen appeared on 17 international editions of Elle, including the Brazilian, German, Italian, Canadian, Japanese and Chinese editions. Under Armour signed Bündchen to a multiyear deal in September 2014. In 2014 and 2015, Bündchen appeared in more television commercial spots than any other Brazilian celebrity in the course of one year in Brazil.

Bündchen was featured in the 2015 Guinness World Record book as the model who earned the most money from June 2014 to June 2015. Bündchen's $700 Taschen book released in celebration of her 20th year career sold out in one day. By 2015, Bündchen appeared in more than 550 advertising campaigns, 2000 magazine covers, 3500 magazine editorials and 800 fashion shows.

Bündchen appeared at the Maracanã Stadium at the opening ceremony of the Summer Olympics in Rio de Janeiro on 5 August 2016.

Forbes ranked Bündchen No. 61 on its Most Powerful Celebrities list in 2012.
Forbes ranked her fourth on the World's Most Powerful Latino Celebrity list in May 2012. In 2013, she ranked No. 5 on the Forbes 10 Most Powerful Businesswomen in Brazil.

In 2013, Bündchen's Ipanema sandals sold about 25 million pairs annually and accounted for more than 60 percent of shoe manufacturer Grendene's annual exports of about $250 million.

In 2014, Bündchen signed a contract with Under Armour, which is reportedly on par with the endorsement compensations of professional athletes and exceeds her former Victoria's Secret contract. In 2016, Under Armour's CEO Kevin Plank said sales for the company's women's brand had increased because of its association with Bündchen.

In 2018, Gisele released her book called Lessons: My Path to a Meaningful Life, which was a New York Times bestseller and was the best selling book for over six months in the non-fiction category in Brazil. The proceeds from her book went to support social and environmental causes.

In February 2021, it was reported that Bündchen was leaving IMG Models after 22 years and that her twin sister Patricia would be taking over as her manager.

In 2021, Bündchen, among other high-profile athletes and celebrities (including ex-husband Tom Brady), was a paid spokesperson for FTX, a cryptocurrency exchange. In November 2022, FTX filed for bankruptcy, wiping out billions of dollars in customer funds as well as Bündchen's personal stake in the company. She, alongside other spokespeople, is currently being sued for promoting unregistered securities through a class-action lawsuit. In February 2022, the U.S. 11th Circuit Court of Appeals ruled in a lawsuit against Bitconnect that the Securities Act of 1933 extends to targeted solicitation using social media.

Public image
In September 2000, Newsweek reported on a survey conducted by Brazilian magazine Capricho, where 86 percent of Brazilian teenagers said they wanted to become fashion models. Capricho attributed the interest in modelling to Bündchen.

By 2014, Bündchen was listed by Forbes as the 89th most powerful woman in the world.
Forbes Brasil listed Bündchen as the No. 2 biggest Brazilian celebrity of 2015 based on media presence and influence in Brazil.

In a 2006 Elle survey, more than 50 percent of American stylists asked gave Bündchen the title of the best hair in Hollywood. A February 2008 survey of more than 20,000 plastic surgeons in 84 countries revealed Bündchen was the celebrity most mentioned for patients having work done on their abdomens and hair, and the second-most mentioned celebrity in the breasts category.

Bündchen was second on Vanity Fairs World's Most Beautiful poll in 2009. In January 2011, Bündchen's was the most desired female body on the 14th Annual Famed Hottest Looks survey. In 2011, Bündchen was one of three women to make AskMen.com's annual "Most Desirable Women" list every year for 10 consecutive years.

Bündchen is ranked No. 4 on Forbes Brasils list of the 100 most influential Brazilian celebrities. In May 2014, Bündchen was ranked No. 89 on Forbes 100 Most Powerful Women in the world, the only model on the list.
In November 2014, Forbes Brasil ranked Bündchen fifth of the 25 biggest celebrities in Brazil, moving her up to second in 2015.

Vogue Italia called Bündchen the "King Midas of fashion" in February 2012, saying companies that invest in her reap the awards of her representation. An Esprit public awareness campaign featuring Bündchen helped raise consumer awareness 9 percent in Germany and 19 percent in China.

In 2016, Bündchen participated in The Beginning of Life, a documentary about "the crucial role that the early years of children’s lives play in determining their futures successes".

Philanthropy
Since the 2000s, Bündchen's main focus has been social and environmental causes. She has also supported the Breast Cancer Campaign to educate women on how to perform a breast self-exam.

Charitable activities

Bündchen donated $150,000 to Brazil's Zero Hunger program. She designed a limited necklace edition for Harper's Bazaar, crafted by jewelers Gumuchian Fils, which were sold to raise money for St. Jude Children's Research Hospital.

An iPod autographed by Bündchen and loaded with her personal playlist was auctioned, and proceeds were donated to Music Rising, a campaign founded in 2005, to replace lost or destroyed instruments of musicians in the Gulf Coast Region after hurricane disasters.

Bündchen became the face of American Express's Product Red-affiliated card in 2006. A portion of earnings from the credit card are donated to HIV/AIDS victims in Africa. In the same year she took part in the I am African fundraising campaign to make AIDS treatment accessible to all of Africa. In 2009, she appeared on 30 covers of the international issues of Elle wearing Product Red clothing and posing with products from companies that support its mission.

Bündchen started The Luz Foundation in 2007, a project to empower girls and help them deal with self-esteem issues.

In 2008, Bündchen auctioned a collection of diamonds to benefit the Diamond Empowerment Fund, a nonprofit organization to education initiatives in countries where diamonds are a natural resource. The collection featured the Ponahalo Diamonds which were valued at $2 million to $4 million, a 6-carat diamond ring worth $120,000–$150,000 and a 3.35-carat Sabbadini diamond ring worth $15,000–$20,000. In 2010, she donated $1.5 million to the Red Cross to aid the relief effort in Haiti after seeing the devastation done by the earthquake. The donation put Bündchen tied for 14th on The Giving Back Fund's list of 30 celebrities who made the largest donations to charity in 2011.

In 2010, together with former president Bill Clinton, Bündchen joined the event that partnered Pantene and the Children's Safe Drinking Water Program to provide clean water to people in need. Bündchen and Indonesian singer-songwriter Anggun announced the kick-off of the Healthy Hair for Healthy Water program at P&G's reception that was held in conjunction with the 2010 Clinton Global Initiative in New York City. Bündchen also attended the Brazil Foundation's 8th Annual Gala to raise funds for fighting challenges faced by poor communities in Brazil. Bündchen created an exclusive design for SIGG water bottles, with proceeds going to WaterCan NGO, a humanitarian organization in Canada that provides the poorest people in the world access to clean water, toilets and information on hygiene.

In 2020, Bündchen formed the Luz Alliance fund in partnership with the Brazil Foundation with a donation of 1,000,000 reals. The fund supports the purchase of hygiene kits, food and financial assistance to families in Brazil through eight different charitable organizations and emergency-response efforts to offset the impact of the COVID-19 pandemic.

Bündchen, along with her husband Brady, partnered with Wheels Up to donate 10 million meals to Feeding America for their "Meals Up" initiative and helped fund thousands of meals for Feeding Tampa Bay and The Greater Boston Food Bank to alleviate food insecurity. Bündchen also partnered with the "All in Challenge" by donated an experience with her at a photo shoot in New York, with all proceeds going to Feeding America, Meals on Wheels, World Central Kitchen and No Kid Hungry.

Environmental work
In 2004, after visiting an Amerindian tribe at the Xingu region in Brazil and seeing firsthand the problems those communities were facing due to water pollution and deforestation, Bündchen decided she had to do something to help bring attention to social and environmental issues. She advocated for the cause and through the years she has supported different projects, especially forest and water related projects in the Amazon rainforest and Atlantic Forest.

In 2007, she signed a "Hotter than I Should Be" T-shirt that was auctioned on eBay for the World Wide Fund for Nature to support the charity's campaign to raise awareness about the causes and impacts of climate change.

Bündchen returned to her hometown of Horizontina in 2008 and with her family launched Projeto Água Limpa (Clean Water Project), which implements sustainable environmental management and promotes the recovery of riparian vegetation and the micro basins of the region. More than one million trees were planted in Bündchen's name following her 2008 American Photo cover to promote Forests of the Future, a project to assist in the reforestation of the Brazilian Atlantic Forest.

In May 2009, Bündchen co-hosted the annual gala of the Rainforest Alliance to honor leaders in sustainability. In May 2011, Bündchen received the Global Environmental Citizen Award in recognition of her eco-efforts. In November 2011, she was awarded Greenest Celebrity at the 2011 International Green awards at the Natural History Museum, London.

Bündchen donates proceeds from the sales from her Ipanema sandals to a different charity each year. Starting in 2006, Bündchen dedicated a percentage of the sales of her line of sandals to environmental projects including "Y Ikatu Xingu", meaning "Save the Good Water of Xingu", the project aimed to recover and protect springs and headwaters of the Xingu River in Brazil. In 2007, she supported World Wildlife Fund project "Nascentes do Brasil" and "De olho nos manaciais" from ISA. In 2008, the project supported was "Florestas do futuro" from SOS Mata Atlantica, a reforestation program for recovery of native species, which contributes to water conservation and biodiversity. A forest was named after her, the Gisele Bündchen Forest, where more than 25000 seedlings of 100 different tree species were planted in her honor, which recovered more than 15 hectares of Atlantic Forest. In 2011, the donation went to the Socio-Environmental Institute. In 2009, she also helped the "Tamar Project", a research initiative and environmental protection of the five species of sea turtles along the Brazilian coast.

In 2012, Bündchen planted a sapling of Sapucaia tree during her visit to Green Nation Fest, an event that occurs every year during the Environment Week and, that year, prior to the realization of Rio +20. Over the years Bündchen participated in several United Nations campaigns to fight against climate change. She participated in challenges on World Environment Day to mobilize people to take action in helping protect the forest, the wildlife, the green economy and to encourage people to reduce their food waste. Bündchen attended Champions of the Earth and Equator Prize ceremonies multiples times.

In 2013, Bündchen supported the United Nations campaign against food waste, THINK.EAT.SAVE. Bündchen and chef Eric Ripert participated in the Today Show program where they showed that it is possible to cook more efficiently.

Bündchen and her husband promote the Earth Hour global movement, a symbolic act promoted worldwide by the World Wildlife Foundation in which governments, companies, and people demonstrate concern for the environment, turning off their lights for sixty minutes.

In January 2014, Bündchen joined the Rainforest Alliance board of directors. Later that year she attended, as a guest of honor the spring annual gala, a ceremony that recognized the industry champions that have sustainability as a priority. In 2014 Bündchen supported the SOKO + The United Nations Trust Fund to End Violence Against Women partnership to support the financial and physical security of women and girls around the world. SOKO artisans in Kenya created a pair of handmade bracelets to raise awareness for the fund. Bündchen had her work in the defense of the environment recognized and was appointed as Goodwill Ambassador for the United Nations Environment Programme (UNEP). Since then, Bündchen has helped UNEP in the mission of raising awareness and inspiring action to protect the environment.

In 2016, she joined the climate change documentary show Years of Living Dangerously as one of its celebrity correspondents.

In addition to using her social networks to share information about different subjects related to the importance of preserving all forms of life, Bündchen also attended a meeting to discuss the matter at the United Nations Headquarters in New York, which happened on the World Wildlife Day in 2016. The date was celebrated with the theme "Wildlife Future is in Our Hands". She also participated in the Wild For Life campaign against the illegal trafficking of endangered wildlife, including the campaign that won the People's Choice Award in the green category of 2019 Webby Awards.

In 2019, Bündchen executive produced a documentary entitled Kiss the Ground. The feature focuses on a group of activists, scientists, farmers, and politicians who band together in a global movement of "Regenerative Agriculture" to balance our climate, replenish our vast water supplies, and feed the world. The film features Bündchen alongside Woody Harrelson, Ian Somerhalder, Patricia Arquette, David Arquette, Tom Brady, and Jason Mraz. The documentary premiered at the 2020 Tribeca Film Festival in New York City in honor of the 50th Anniversary of Earth Day. In 2020 on her birthday Bündchen launched the Viva a Vida initiative and donated funds to plant 40,000 trees along the Xingu and Araguaia River in Brazil.

Goodwill ambassador

Bündchen and her former husband, Tom Brady, served Thanksgiving dinner to more than 400 job trainees at Goodwill Industries International's headquarters in Roxbury, Massachusetts, in November 2008.

In September 2009, Bündchen was designated Goodwill Ambassador for the United Nations Environment Programme. She made her first visit to Africa as UNEP Goodwill Ambassador in January 2012.

In January 2012, Bündchen visited Kenya to experience the reality of energy poverty as part of the Energy for All 2030 project. On the eve of World Environment Day in June 2012, Bündchen, planted the first of a series of 50,000 trees in Rio de Janeiro. In January 2014, Bündchen joined the Rainforest Alliance board of directors.

Personal life
From 2000 to 2005, Bündchen was in a relationship with actor Leonardo DiCaprio. In 2004, Bündchen and DiCaprio made Peoples annual Most Beautiful Couples List. After experiencing a period of depression, Bündchen decided to end her relationship with DiCaprio after she felt their lifestyles no longer complemented, saying in her memoir Lessons, "I was becoming more and more aware of things that I'd chosen not to look at. Was I alone in wanting to do some serious soul-searching while he stayed the same? In the end, unfortunately, the answer was yes."

In December 2006, Bündchen began dating NFL quarterback Tom Brady, after a mutual friend introduced them on a blind date. The couple married on 26 February 2009 in a small ceremony at St. Monica Catholic Church in Santa Monica, California. In April 2009, the couple had a second marriage ceremony, in Costa Rica. Bündchen and Brady have two children: a son (born 2009), and a daughter (born 2012). She is the stepmother of Brady's first son (born 2007) from a previous relationship with actress Bridget Moynahan. Bündchen and Brady are Catholics. On 28 October 2022, Bündchen and Brady finalized their divorce after 13 years of marriage.

Bündchen practices Transcendental Meditation. She and her family adhere to a primarily plant-based diet developed by their personal chef Allen Campbell. They have lived in Brookline, Massachusetts, when Tom Brady played for the New England Patriots, and reside part-time in New York City. They have since moved to Tampa, Florida, after Brady went to play for the Tampa Bay Buccaneers. In December 2020, the couple reportedly bought a home in Indian Creek, Florida.

In February 2022, Bundchen began training Brazilian jiu-jitsu under the Valente brothers.

Wealth
In August 2011, Bündchen ranked 60th on the Forbes list of the World's 100 Most Powerful Women. At age 31, she ranked third on The 20 Youngest Power Women of 2011 List. In 2011, Forbes named Bündchen and Brady as the World's Highest-Paid Celebrity couple. In August 2012, Bündchen was one of four people in the fashion industry and the only model to be ranked on the Forbes list of "The World's Most Powerful Women", at No. 83. She ranked eighth in the top 10 of the Forbes list of "Entertainment's Highest-Paid Women" in 2012.

Forbes ranked Bündchen as the world's top-earning model for the fifth consecutive time in May 2011. Bündchen disputed the number used by Forbes, telling Brazilian website MdeMulher that the inflated estimates have made her a subject of an audit by the Internal Revenue Service. In 2013, Bündchen ranked third on the 16 Most Successful Female Entrepreneurs list by Forbes. Forbes estimated Bündchen's 2016 income at $30.5 million. Bündchen was the highest-paid model in the world from 2002 to 2017.

Spirituality 
Bündchen believes in astrology, manifestation, and witchcraft. According to Tom Brady, she has used these methods to successfully predict when he would win or lose the Super Bowl.

Filmography

Discography

Singles

Music videos

Awards and nominations

See also
List of Brazilians

References

External links

Voguepedia

1980 births
Living people
Brazilian bloggers
Brazilian emigrants to the United States
Brazilian environmentalists
Brazilian women environmentalists
Brazilian female models
Brazilian people of German descent
Brazilian models of German descent
Breastfeeding activists
Brazilian Roman Catholics
Environmental bloggers
IMG Models models
People from Rio Grande do Sul
Victoria's Secret
Brazilian women bloggers
Twin models
Brazilian health activists
Victoria's Secret Angels
Brazilian women activists
Tom Brady
Brazilian American